Tomes is a surname, derived from Thomas. It may refer to

 Alan Tomes (born 1951), Scottish rugby player
 Josef Tomeš (born 1954), Czech historian
 Kimberly Tomes (born 1956), American beauty queen
 Margot Tomes (1917–1991), American children's book illustrator
 Robert Tomes (1817–1882), American physician, diplomat and writer
 Robert Fisher Tomes (1823–1904), English zoologist
 Sean Tomes, British rugby player

Other
 Tomes's process, a histologic landmark on ameloblasts, cells associated with tooth development
 Tomes's sword-nosed bat (Lonchorhina aurita), a bat species from South and Central America
 Tomes's rice rat (Nephelomys albigularis), a rat species from South and Central America

See also
 Tome (disambiguation)
 Tomes & Talismans, a 1986 American educational television series